The 1956 United States presidential election in New York took place on November 6, 1956. All contemporary 48 states were part of the 1956 United States presidential election. Voters chose 45 electors to the Electoral College, which selected the president and vice president.

New York was won by incumbent Republican President Dwight D. Eisenhower, who was running against former Democratic Governor of Illinois Adlai Stevenson. Eisenhower ran with incumbent Vice President Richard Nixon, and Stevenson ran with Tennessee Senator, and principal opponent during the 1956 Democratic Primaries, Estes Kefauver. Eisenhower received 61.24% of the vote to Stevenson's 38.73%, a margin of 22.51%. Eisenhower won 4.3 million votes, the most ever received by a Republican presidential candidate in the state's history.

New York weighed in for this election as eight percentage points more Republican than the national average. This election was very much of a re-match from the previous presidential election 4 years earlier, which featured the same major candidates except for John Sparkman being replaced as Stevenson’s running mate by Kefauver. The presidential election of 1956 was a very partisan election for New York, with 99.8% of the electorate voting for either the Democratic Party or the Republican Party. The widely popular Eisenhower took every county in the State of New York outside of New York City, dominating upstate by landslide margins and also sweeping suburban areas around NYC. Stevenson narrowly won New York City overall by carrying the boroughs of Manhattan, Brooklyn and the Bronx, while Eisenhower won Queens and Staten Island.

Eisenhower won the election in New York by a 22-point landslide. The presidential election of 1956 is one of the final elections in American politics featuring a Democratic stronghold in the former slave states. This was also one of the first elections in New York (and nationally) where most campaign finances went to television ads. Stevenson campaigned on a platform of expansion of government social programs founded under former President Franklin D. Roosevelt, scaling back the Cold War with the Soviet Union, and ending the U.S. draft, seeking an 'all volunteer armed forces.'  While Stevenson's policies were largely popular with many people living in the United States at the time, Eisenhower's post World War II star-power, his recently recovered health, and his strong stance against peace-talks with the Soviet Union, won Eisenhower a landslide victory across the United States, including in New York.

Eisenhower had first won election to the White House in 1952 as a war hero, a political outsider, and a moderate Republican who pledged to protect and support popular New Deal Democratic policies, finally ending 20 years of Democratic control of the White House.  

1956 was the last election in which a Republican presidential candidate took more than 60% of the vote in New York State and won the state by more than twenty points. New York would not vote Republican again until Eisenhower’s running mate, Richard Nixon, won the state in his re-election bid in 1972. To date, this is also the last presidential election in which New York voted more Republican than the nation as a whole.

Results

Results by county

See also
 United States presidential elections in New York
 History of nuclear weapons
 Presidency of Dwight D. Eisenhower
 Cold War

Notes

References

New York
1956
1956 New York (state) elections